Joe Giardullo (born July 24, 1948, in Brooklyn, NY) is a soprano saxophonist and composer who is known for his work with Joe McPhee. While with McPhee, Giardullo has performed at some of the more notable jazz festivals. More recently, Giardullo has given workshops at themed events.

Discography

With Joe McPhee
Specific Gravity (Boxholder 1997 [2001])
In the Spirit (CIMP, 1999)
 No Greater Love (CIMP, 1999 [2000])
Gravity (1979) 
Something Quiet (2011)

References

External links 
 Official site
 Biography (RoguArt)
 Interview
 Portrait (SopranoPlanet)
  
 Joe Giardullo (Discography)

Musicians from Brooklyn
American male saxophonists
American jazz soprano saxophonists
Jazz soprano saxophonists
American jazz composers
1948 births
Living people
Jazz musicians from New York (state)
21st-century American saxophonists
American male jazz composers
21st-century American male musicians